Arnah is a Syrian village in the Qatana District of the Rif Dimashq Governorate. According to the Syria Central Bureau of Statistics (CBS), Arnah had a population of 3,146 in the 2004 census. Its inhabitants are predominantly Druze.

History
In 1838, Eli Smith noted Arnah's population as Druze and Orthodox Christians.

References

Bibliography

 

Druze communities in Syria
Populated places in Qatana District